Sympistis sobek is a moth of the family Noctuidae. It is found in Oregon.

The wingspan is about 34 mm.

External links
 Images at mothphotographersgroup

sobek
Moths described in 2008